Cheick Mohamed Kafoumba Touré (born 1 January 1994) is a Malian professional footballer who plays for Belgian club A.F.C. Tubize on loan from Antwerp, as a forward.

Touré has played for AS Gabès, Stade Tunisien, Ohod, Qadsia and Antwerp.

Career

Royal Antwerp
Touré joined Antwerp in the summer 2017. However, Touré failed to convince, appearing only in two games. A year after his arrival, he was loaned out to Al-Washm Club and later Kawkab Marrakech. In September 2019 he was loaned out again, this time to A.F.C. Tubize.

References

External links

1994 births
Living people
Malian footballers
AS Gabès players
Stade Tunisien players
Ohod Club players
Qadsia SC players
Royal Antwerp F.C. players
Al-Washm Club players
Kawkab Marrakech players
A.F.C. Tubize players
Tunisian Ligue Professionnelle 1 players
Saudi First Division League players
Belgian Pro League players
Belgian Third Division players
Botola players
Association football forwards
Malian expatriate footballers
Malian expatriate sportspeople in Tunisia
Expatriate footballers in Tunisia
Malian expatriate sportspeople in Saudi Arabia
Expatriate footballers in Saudi Arabia
Malian expatriate sportspeople in Kuwait
Expatriate footballers in Kuwait
Malian expatriate sportspeople in Belgium
Expatriate footballers in Belgium
Malian expatriate sportspeople in Morocco
Expatriate footballers in Morocco
Kuwait Premier League players
21st-century Malian people